Virgilus is a genus of South American tangled nest spiders containing the single species, Virgilus normalis. It was  first described by V. D. Roth in 1967, and has only been found in Ecuador.

References

Amaurobiidae
Monotypic Araneomorphae genera
Spiders of South America